Gaëtan Bucki (born 9 May 1980 in Béthune, Pas-de-Calais) is a French shot putter.

Achievements

References

1980 births
Living people
People from Béthune
French male shot putters
Sportspeople from Pas-de-Calais
Competitors at the 2003 Summer Universiade
Athletes (track and field) at the 2005 Mediterranean Games
Athletes (track and field) at the 2009 Mediterranean Games
Mediterranean Games competitors for France
20th-century French people
21st-century French people